Osama Ashoor (born 7 January 1990) is a Saudi football player who plays for Bisha as a defender.

References

1990 births
Living people
Saudi Arabian footballers
Al Nassr FC players
Al-Fateh SC players
Ohod Club players
Al-Riyadh SC players
Abha Club players
Al-Kawkab FC players
Al-Dahab Club players
Bisha FC players
Saudi Professional League players
Saudi First Division League players
Saudi Second Division players
Saudi Third Division players
Association football defenders